Yakovlevo is a rural locality (a village) in Yugskoye Rural Settlement, Cherepovetsky District, Vologda Oblast, Russia. The population was 15 as of 2002.

Geography 
Yakovlevo is located 45 km southeast of Cherepovets (the district's administrative centre) by road. Ryabovo is the nearest rural locality.

References 

Rural localities in Cherepovetsky District